Fábio Aguiar da Silva (born 28 February 1989) is a Brazilian professional footballer who plays as a defender for Altos.

Career

Yokohama F. Marinos
In 2013 Fábio signed for Japanese J. League Division 1 side Yokohama F. Marinos for the season and he made his debut for the club on 20 March 2013 in the J. League Cup against Kawasaki Frontale in which he started and played the full 90 as Yokohama went on to win the match 1–0.

Career statistics
Updated to 31 August 2019.

Honours
Yokohama F. Marinos
Emperor's Cup: 2013

References

External links

1989 births
Living people
Sportspeople from Rio de Janeiro (state)
Brazilian footballers
Brazilian expatriate footballers
J1 League players
Association football defenders
Expatriate footballers in Japan
Duque de Caxias Futebol Clube players
SC Sagamihara players
Yokohama F. Marinos players
Gamba Osaka players
Júbilo Iwata players